Gianluca Buccellati (born December 21, 1990), also known as Luca and Bien et Toi, is a Grammy-nominated and Mercury Prize winning American musician, record producer, songwriter, mixing engineer, audio engineer, and multi-instrumentalist. He has worked alongside artists including Lana Del Rey, Arlo Parks, Tei Shi, Overcoats, Biig Piig, Sophie Meiers, The Marias, Cailin Russo, Hazel English, HMLTD and Tender. Buccellati largely wrote and produced Arlo Park's critically acclaimed debut album Collapsed in Sunbeams, which peaked at No. 3 on the UK Albums Chart, won the 2021 Mercury Prize and was nominated for Best Alternative Music Album at the 64th Annual Grammy Awards as well as for the Album of the Year at the 41st Brit Awards.

Life and career 
Buccellati, a native of Katonah, New York, now resides in Los Angeles. He is a member of the band White China.

He began working with British singer-songwriter Arlo Parks in 2018.

In August 2021, Buccellati was nominated for an Ivor Novello Award for the Best Song Musically and Lyrically for his work on the song Black Dog. In September 2021, Buccellati and Parks won the Mercury Prize for the album Collapsed In Sunbeams. In April 2022, Parks and Buccellati received a nomination for Best Alternative Music Album at the 64th Annual Grammy Awards for the album Collapsed in Sunbeams.

Discography

Producer and writer discography

Awards and nominations

References 

American record producers
American songwriters
1990 births
Living people